The knockout phase of the 2012–13 UEFA Champions League began on 12 February and concluded on 25 May 2013 with the final at Wembley Stadium in London, England.

Times are CET/CEST, as listed by UEFA (local times are in parentheses).

Round and draw dates
All draws were held at UEFA headquarters in Nyon, Switzerland.

Format
The knockout phase involved the sixteen teams who finished in the top two in each of their groups in the group stage.

Each tie in the knockout phase, apart from the final, was played over two legs, with each team playing one leg at home. The team that had the higher aggregate score over the two legs progressed to the next round. In the event that aggregate scores finished level, the away goals rule was applied, i.e. the team that scored more goals away from home over the two legs progressed. If away goals were also equal, then thirty minutes of extra time were played, divided into two fifteen-minutes halves. The away goals rule was again applied after extra time, i.e. if there were goals scored during extra time and the aggregate score was still level, the visiting team qualified by virtue of more away goals scored. If no goals were scored during extra time, the tie was decided by a penalty shoot-out. In the final, the tie was played as a single match. If scores were level at the end of normal time in the final, extra time was played, followed by penalties if scores remained tied.

The mechanism of the draws for each round was as follows:
In the draw for the round of 16, the eight group winners were seeded, and the eight group runners-up were unseeded. A seeded team was drawn against an unseeded team, with the seeded team hosting the second leg. Teams from the same group or the same association could not be drawn against each other.
In the draws for the quarter-finals onwards, there were no seedings, and teams from the same group or the same association could be drawn with each other.

Qualified teams

Bracket

Round of 16
The first legs were played on 12, 13, 19 and 20 February, and the second legs were played on 5, 6, 12 and 13 March 2013.

|}

Matches

Galatasaray won 4–3 on aggregate. 

Juventus won 5–0 on aggregate. 

3–3 on aggregate. Bayern Munich won on away goals.

A minute's silence was held before the match to commemorate the victims of the crash of South Airlines Flight 8971, which had been filled mostly with football fans heading for the match.

Borussia Dortmund won 5–2 on aggregate.

Barcelona won 4–2 on aggregate.

Real Madrid won 3–2 on aggregate.

Paris Saint-Germain won 3–2 on aggregate.

Málaga won 2–1 on aggregate.

Quarter-finals
The first legs were played on 2 and 3 April, and the second legs were played on 9 and 10 April 2013.

|}

Matches

Borussia Dortmund won 3–2 on aggregate.

Real Madrid won 5–3 on aggregate.

3–3 on aggregate. Barcelona won on away goals.

Bayern Munich won 4–0 on aggregate.

Semi-finals
The first legs were played on 23 and 24 April, and the second legs were played on 30 April and 1 May 2013.

|}

Matches

Bayern Munich won 7–0 on aggregate.

Borussia Dortmund won 4–3 on aggregate.

Final

The final was played on 25 May 2013 at Wembley Stadium in London, England.

Notes

References

External links
2012–13 UEFA Champions League, UEFA.com

Knockout Phase
2012-13